Golgin subfamily A member 8H, also known as GOLGA8H, is a protein that in Homo sapiens is encoded by the GOLGA8H gene. Function of the GOLGA8H involves a process that is carried out at the cellular level which results in the assembly, arrangement of constituent parts, or disassembly of the Golgi apparatus.

Gene

Aliases 
The most common aliases for GOLGA8H are the following:

 Golgin A8 Family Member H 2 3 5 or Member H 2
 Golgi Autoantigen, Golgin Subfamily A, 6-Like 11 2 3
 Golgin Subfamily A Member 8H 3 4
 Golgin Subfamily A Member 8-Like Protein 1 3
 GOLGA6L11

Prevalence and Location 
GOLGA8H, when compared to many other genes, exists in many different places that span multiple chromosomes:. NCBI lists the gene’s location on the long (q) arm on Chromosome 15 in the q13.2 region, from 30,604,030 - 30,617,827 (13,798 nt in length)

In actuality, when running the FASTA protein sequence of GOLGA8H on BLAT (the BLAST-Like Alignment Tool), it is found to exist in 85 or 87 different locations (depending on an individual’s sex chromosomes). 81 copies of the protein exist on chromosome 15, one copy each on chromosomes 7, 9,10, and 12, and two copies on the Y chromosome

Copies of GOLGA8H in Homo Sapiens

Neighborhood 
It would be tedious and inefficient to list all gene neighborhoods for the 87 locations of GOLGA8H. Thus, here are surrounding genes of GOLGA8H on chromosome 15 in the q13.2 region listed on NCBI:

Gene Neighborhood of GOLGA8H on Chromosome 15 q13.2 in Homo sapiens:

Transcript 
There are no isoforms of GOLGA8H.

Multiple Sequence Alignment

Paralogs 
A multiple sequence alignment (MSA) of GOLGA8H and its top seven paralogs was created using Clustal Omega [1]. [Appendix A] All eight genes from the Golgin Subfamily A Member 8 group were 632 amino acids in length [1]. All 632 amino acids of GOLGA8H and its top seven paralogs were analyzed and compared using Clustal Omega were analyzed and compared in an attempt to understand what makes Golgin Subfamily A Member 8H, GOLGA8H, a distinct entity. Two amino acids make GOLGA8H unique: Valine at amino acid 32 and Cysteine at amino acid 169. For all seven paralogs, the amino acid in position 32 is Isoleucine and the amino acid in position 169 is Arginine

Protein 
The predicted molecular weight of GOLGA8H, rounded down to three significant figures, is 71.3 kDa. This is a theoretical value; predicted molecular weights are merely based on the amino acids present in the protein. The theoretical isoelectric point of GOLGA8H, rounded down to one significant figure, is a pI of 8

Composition 
When compared to other human proteins, GOLGA8H is semi glutamine- and glutamate-enriched. In contrast, GOLGA8H is depleted in threonine, phenylalanine, and tyrosene. 

There are no charge runs, hydrophobic segments, or transmembrane domains in the GOLGA8H protein. There are 62 amino acid multiplets for the protein, which is higher than the expected range. It also has amino acid patterns with high periodicity

Motifs 
There are 11 motifs present in GOLGA8H:. The single experimentally-verified motif is a glutamine-rich protein located in the 323-416 amino acid region.

Post-Translational Modifications 
GOLGA8H is predicted to undergo phosphorylation at multiple locations of serine, threonine, and tyrosine throughout its structure. It is expected to undergo phosphorylation most frequently on serine amino acids. Furthermore, there is one predicted N-linked glycosylation site, which occurs at amino acid 39. The sequence for this site is NGS. N-linked glycosylation functions intrinsically and extrinsically to assist in regulating the migration patterns of cells.

Primary Sequence 
The protein is 632 amino acids long. It has 19 exons and two polyadenylation signals. Its sequence only partially matches a Kozak consensus sequence.

Secondary Structure 
The predicted secondary structure of GOLGA8H is composed of 81% alpha helices, 25.6% beta sheets, and 17.2% turns.

Using Phyre2, 284 residues (45% of GOLGA8H) was modeled with 97.8% confidence by the single highest scoring template. This structure shows an extremely high proportion of alpha helices:

Tertiary Structure 
A predicted model for a tertiary structure of GOLGA8H was generated using I-TASSER

Transcript level regulation

Promoter 
There is one promoter for the GOLGA8H gene, GXP_2235212, which is 1197 nt long. It lies from base pairs 30,603,030 to 30,604,226 on the positive strand

Transcription Factor Binding Sites 
Several transcription factors are predicted to bind to the promoter sequence. Some examples include:

 Myoblast determining factors
 MAF- and AP1-related factors
 GATA binding factors
 E-box binding factors
 AP4 and related proteins
 Brachyury gene, mesoderm developmental factor
 Peroxisome proliferator-activated receptor
 CCAAT binding factors

Homology and evolution

Paralogs 
GOLGA8H has several dozen paralogs. There are seven paralogs with identity similarities above 90%, charted below under GOLGA8H (included as a reference point):

Orthologs 
Putting the amino acid sequence of GOLGA8H through a protein BLAST via NCBI does not yield any hits for orthologs:. However, putting the same sequence through BLAT (the BLAST-Like Alignment Tool) yields multiple orthologs

**Chromosomes labeled as 'uncharacterized' have clone contigs (an assembled set of overlapping DNA sequences) that cannot be confidently placed on a specific chromosome. Similar contigs are concatenated together into short pseudo-chromosomes.

Expression 
Data from NCBI shows that GOLGA8H in Homo sapiens has the strongest expression is through the thyroid and testis, with RKPMs of 12.2 and 12.1 respectively. It is also expressed in lesser amounts in 25 other tissues. 
Data from GEO DataSet show the tissue expression is highest in bone marrow and pancreas tissue. However, samples from all tissues were above the 90th percentile, indicating that the expression value of that gene is much higher in respect to all other genes on the array.

When comparing GOLGA8H tissue expression in abnormal conditions to normal human tissue levels, there is not significant deviation in its expression with any variable. This supports the notion that GOLGA8H is ubiquitous.

Interactions 
GOLGA8H has been shown to interact with Ubiquitin C (UBC). UBC is a polyubiquitin precursor. Polyubiquitin precursors are a chain of the protein ubiquitin that can be turned into an active form by post-translational modifications. This can mark proteins for degradation, alter their cellular location, affect their activity, and promote or prevent protein interactions. Further research on the link between ubiquitin and the Golgi apparatus include a reliance on ubiquitin to achieve certain processes around the Golgi apparatus.

String db lists the following genes as interacting with GOLGA8H:

Splice variants 
The Homo sapiens GOLGA8H gene has 1 splice variant

References 

Human proteins